Lily May Laight (born 22 December 2001) is an English actress, singer, dancer from Devon. Laight is known for acting in Love, Rosie, In Secret and Frequencies.

Career 
Laight comes from a theatrical family and made her stage debut at the age of two. She first appeared at the Babbacombe theatre, Torquay as part of the supporting act Kidz Aloud troupe aged 7. Following her success in the "Torbay's Got Talent" contest at age 8 she appeared as a soloist at the Babbacombe theatre for their "Christmas Laughter Party". Appearances in London theatre, television, and film have followed.

Laight appeared in a new production of Hairspray at London's Coliseum Theatre 21 June 2021 for a limited run starring alongside Michael Ball and Paul Merton.

Personal
Laight's mother is a retired professional dancer. Rebecca Laight is choreographer for the 2019 production Wonderful Christmastime. Laight's father is Ellis Laight who was a professional football player with  Torquay United (41 appearances 23 as substitute, 3 goals) and numerous non -league sides including Dorchester, Taunton, Biddeford,  Buckland Athletic becoming their manager until 2017 when he resigned.

Filmography

Film and television

Theatre

References

External links 
 

Living people
English child actresses
English television actresses
English stage actresses
21st-century English actresses
2001 births
Musicians from Torquay
English film actresses
21st-century English singers
21st-century British dancers
Actors from Torquay